Karoi Rydings is a school in Zimbabwe that was attacked by "squatters" in the year 2000 and thus closed. The 1,100 acre farm where the school sat upon was owned by British veterans and was invaded by "squatters". It was a primary school with three hundred pupils under eleven. It was managed by run by a non-profit-making organisation and the profit from the farm was used to subsidise school fees for white children from Zambia and Malawi.

References

Schools in Zimbabwe
Educational institutions disestablished in 2000
2000 disestablishments in Zimbabwe
Defunct schools in Zimbabwe